Anne-Lise Parisien (born October 22, 1972, in Lewiston, Maine) is a former American alpine skier who competed in the 1994 Winter Olympics, finishing 13th in the women's giant slalom.

External links
 sports-reference.com
 

1972 births
Living people
American female alpine skiers
Olympic alpine skiers of the United States
Alpine skiers at the 1994 Winter Olympics
Sportspeople from Lewiston, Maine
21st-century American women